This is a list of the National Register of Historic Places listings in Robertson County, Texas.

This is intended to be a complete list of properties and districts listed on the National Register of Historic Places in Robertson County, Texas. There are one district and four individual properties listed on the National Register in the county. One individually listed property is a State Antiquities Landmark and contains within it a Recorded Texas Historic Landmark (RTHL). The remaining three individually listed properties are each also RTHLs while the district holds several more.

Current listings

The locations of National Register properties and districts may be seen in a mapping service provided.

|}

See also

National Register of Historic Places listings in Texas
Recorded Texas Historic Landmarks in Robertson County

References

External links

Robertson County, Texas
Robertson County
Buildings and structures in Robertson County, Texas